This is a list of the Australian species of the subfamily Arctiinae. It also acts as an index to the species articles and forms part of the full List of moths of Australia.

Tribe Arctiini
Aloa costalis Walker, 1865
Aloa gangara Swinhoe, 1892
Aloa marginata (Donovan, 1805)
Amerila alberti (Rothschild, 1910)
Amerila crokeri (W.S. Macleay, 1826)
Amerila nigropunctata (Bethune-Baker, 1908)
Amerila rubripes Walker, 1865
Amerila serica Meyrick, 1886
Amerila simillima (Rothschild, 1917)
Amerila timolis (Rothschild, 1914)
Argina astraea (Drury, 1773)
Cheliosea cosmeta (Lower, 1907)
Creatonotos gangis (Linnaeus, 1763)
Nyctemera amicus (White, 1841)
Nyctemera baulus (Boisduval, 1832)
Nyctemera luctuosa (Vollenhoven, 1863)
Nyctemera secundiana T.P. Lucas, 1891
Paralacydes maculifascia (Walker, 1855)
Phaos aglaophara Turner, 1926
Phaos interfixa Walker, 1855
Spilosoma canescens (Butler, 1875)
Spilosoma curvata (Donovan, 1805)
Spilosoma erythrastis Meyrick, 1886
Spilosoma glatignyi (Le Guillou, 1841)
Spilosoma nobilis Turner, 1940
Tyria jacobaeae (Linnaeus, 1758)
Utetheisa aegrotum (Swinhoe, 1892)
Utetheisa lotrix (Cramer, 1777)
Utetheisa pectinata Hampson, 1907
Utetheisa pellex (Linnaeus, 1758)
Utetheisa pulchelloides Hampson, 1907

Subtribe Euchromiina
Euchromia aemulina Butler, 1877
Euchromia creusa (Linnaeus, 1758)
Euchromia lurlina Butler, 1888
Euchromia polymena (Linnaeus, 1758)

Tribe Syntomini
Amata annulata (Fabricius, 1775)
Amata antitheta (Meyrick, 1886)
Amata aperta (Walker, 1865)
Amata atricornuta Gaede, 1926
Amata bicolor (Walker, 1854)
Amata chlorometis (Meyrick, 1886)
Amata choneutospila (Turner, 1905)
Amata chroma (Swinhoe, 1892)
Amata chromatica (Turner, 1905)
Amata cyanura (Meyrick, 1886)
Amata dyschlaena (Turner, 1905)
Amata heptaspila (Turner, 1905)
Amata hesperitis (Meyrick, 1886)
Amata huebneri (Boisduval, 1828)
Amata humeralis (Butler, 1876)
Amata hyalota (Meyrick, 1886)
Amata insularis (Butler, 1876)
Amata lampetis (Turner, 1898)
Amata leucacma (Meyrick, 1886)
Amata lucta (T.P. Lucas, 1901)
Amata macroplaca (Meyrick, 1886)
Amata magistri (Turner, 1905)
Amata marella (Butler, 1876)
Amata melitospila (Turner, 1905)
Amata nigriceps (Butler, 1876)
Amata ochrospila (Turner, 1922)
Amata olinda (Swinhoe, 1892)
Amata orphnaea (Turner, 1898)
Amata pactolina (Walker, 1865)
Amata paradelpha (Turner, 1905)
Amata paraula (Meyrick, 1886)
Amata phaeochyta (Turner, 1907)
Amata phepsalotis (Meyrick, 1886)
Amata prosomoea (Turner, 1905)
Amata pyrocoma (Meyrick, 1886)
Amata recedens (T.P. Lucas, 1891)
Amata trigonophora (Turner, 1898)
Amata xanthosoma (Turner, 1898)
Amata xanthura (Turner, 1905)
Ceryx guttulosa (Walker, 1865)
Ceryx sphenodes (Meyrick, 1886)
Eressa angustipenna (T.P. Lucas, 1890)
Eressa geographica (Meyrick, 1886)
Eressa megalospilia Turner, 1922
Eressa megatorna Hampson, 1898
Eressa paurospila Turner, 1922
Eressa rhysoptila (Turner, 1922)
Eressa strepsimeris (Meyrick, 1886)

Tribe Lithosiini
Aedoea decreta (Butler, 1877)
Ameleta panochra Turner, 1940
Anestia ombrophanes Meyrick, 1886
Anestia semiochrea (Butler, 1886)
Arrhythmica semifusca Turner, 1940
Asura bipars (Walker, 1865)
Asura catameces Turner, 1940
Asura cervicalis Walker, 1854
Asura coccinocosma Turner, 1940
Asura compsodes Turner, 1940
Asura crocopepla Turner, 1940
Asura crocoptera Turner, 1940
Asura lydia (Donovan, 1805)
Asura monospila Turner, 1940
Asura obliterans Draudt, 1914
Asura polyspila Turner, 1940
Asura semivitrea (Rothschild, 1913)
Asura zebrina (Hampson, 1914)
Atelophleps tridesma Turner, 1940
Ateucheta zatesima (Hampson, 1914)
Calamidia hirta (Walker, 1854)
Castulo doubledayi Newman, 1857
Castulo plagiata Walker, 1854
Chamaita barnardi (T.P. Lucas, 1894)
Chrysomesia lophoptera (Turner, 1940)
Chrysoscota tanyphara Turner, 1940
Ctenosia infuscata Lower, 1902
Cyana asticta (Hampson, 1909)
Cyana meyricki (Rothschild, 1901)
Cyana obscura (Hampson, 1900)
Damias catarrhoa (Meyrick, 1886)
Damias elegans Boisduval, 1832
Damias leptosema (Turner, 1940)
Damias pelochroa (Hampson, 1914)
Damias procrena (Meyrick, 1886)
Damias scripta (Lower, 1902)
Damias sicciodes (Hampson, 1914)
Diduga flavicostata (Snellen, 1878)
Eilema plana (Boisduval, 1832)
Eilema pseudoluteola Strand, 1922
Eutane terminalis Walker, 1854
Eutane trimochla Turner, 1940
Goniosema anguliscripta (T.P. Lucas, 1890)
Goniosema euraphota Turner, 1940
Graphosia lophopyga (Turner, 1940)
Graphosia stenopepla Hampson, 1914
Gymnasura flavia (Hampson, 1900)
Gymnasura prionosticha (Turner, 1940)
Gymnasura saginaea (Turner, 1899)
Halone consolatrix (Rosenstock, 1885)
Halone coryphoea Hampson, 1914
Halone ebaea Hampson, 1914
Halone epiopsis Turner, 1940
Halone interspersa (T.P. Lucas, 1890)
Halone ophiodes (Meyrick, 1886)
Halone prosenes Turner, 1940
Halone pteridaula (Turner, 1922)
Halone sejuncta (R. Felder & Rogenhofer, 1875)
Halone servilis (Meyrick, 1886)
Halone sinuata (Wallengren, 1860)
Halone sobria Walker, 1854
Hectobrocha adoxa (Meyrick, 1886)
Hectobrocha multilinea T.P. Lucas, 1890
Hectobrocha pentacyma Meyrick, 1886
Hectobrocha subnigra T.P. Lucas, 1890
Heliosia charopa Turner, 1904
Heliosia jucunda (Walker, 1854)
Heliosia micra Hampson, 1903
Heliosia perichares Turner, 1944
Hemonia micrommata (Turner, 1899)
Hemonia pallida Hampson, 1914
Hemonia simillima Rothschild, 1913
Hestiarcha pyrrhopa Meyrick, 1886
Hesychopa chionora (Meyrick, 1886)
Hesychopa molybdica Turner, 1940
Heterallactis euchrysa Meyrick, 1886
Heterallactis microchrysa Turner, 1940
Heterallactis niphocephala Turner, 1940
Heterallactis phlogozona (Turner, 1904)
Heterallactis stenochrysa Turner, 1940
Heterallactis trigonochrysa Turner, 1940
Heterotropa fastosa Turner, 1940
Hobapromea cleta (Turner, 1940)
Hyposhada pellopis (Bethune-Baker, 1908)
Ionthas ataracta Hampson, 1914
Ionthas thirkelli (Fraser, 1961)
Lambula obliquilinea Hampson, 1900
Lambula phyllodes (Meyrick, 1886)
Lambula pleuroptycha Turner, 1940
Lambula pristina (Walker, 1866)
Lambula transcripta (T.P. Lucas, 1890)
Lepista pulverulenta (T.P. Lucas, 1890)
Lyclene pyraula (Meyrick, 1886)
Lyclene quadrilineata (Pagenstecher, 1886)
Lyclene reticulata (C. Felder, 1861)
Lyclene serratilinea (Turner, 1940)
Lyclene structa (Walker, 1854)
Macaduma pallicosta Rothschild, 1912
Macaduma strongyla Turner, 1922
Macaduma toxophora (Turner, 1899)
Manulea dorsalis (Walker, 1866)
Manulea replana (Lewin, 1805)
Melastrota nigrisquamata (Swinhoe, 1901)
Meteura cervina (T.P. Lucas, 1890)
Microstola ammoscia Lower, 1920
Notata modicus (T.P. Lucas, 1892)
Oeonistis altica (Linnaeus, 1768)
Oreopola athola Turner, 1940
Padenodes cuprizona (Hampson, 1914)
Palaeosia bicosta (Walker, 1854)
Panachranta lirioleuca Turner, 1922
Parascaptia biplagata Bethune-Baker, 1908
Parascaptia dochmoschema (Turner, 1940)
Parelictis saleuta Meyrick, 1886
Phaeophlebosia furcifera (Walker, 1854)
Phenacomorpha bisecta (T.P. Lucas, 1891)
Philenora aspectalella (Walker, 1864)
Philenora cataplex Turner, 1940
Philenora chionastis (Meyrick, 1886)
Philenora elegans (Butler, 1877)
Philenora irregularis (T.P. Lucas, 1890)
Philenora lunata (T.P. Lucas, 1890)
Philenora malthaca Turner, 1944
Philenora nudaridia Hampson, 1900
Philenora omophanes (Meyrick, 1886)
Philenora placochrysa (Turner, 1899)
Philenora pteridopola Turner, 1922
Philenora undulosa (Walker, 1858)
Poliodule melanotricha Turner, 1941
Poliodule poliotricha Turner, 1940
Poliodule xanthodelta (Lower, 1897)
Poliosia fragilis (T.P. Lucas, 1890)
Pseudophanes melanoptera Turner, 1940
Psilopepla mollis (T.P. Lucas, 1894)
Scaphidriotis camptopleura (Turner, 1940)
Scaphidriotis xylogramma Turner, 1899
Scaptesyle dichotoma (Meyrick, 1886)
Scaptesyle dictyota (Meyrick, 1886)
Scaptesyle equidistans (T.P. Lucas, 1890)
Scaptesyle middletoni (Turner, 1941)
Scaptesyle monogrammaria (Walker, 1863)
Scaptesyle tetramita Turner, 1940
Schistophleps albida (Walker, 1865)
Schistophleps obducta (T.P. Lucas, 1894)
Scoliacma adrasta (Turner, 1940)
Scoliacma bicolora (Boisduval, 1832)
Scoliacma fasciata (Aurivillius, 1920)
Scoliacma nana (Walker, 1854)
Scoliacma pactolias Meyrick, 1886
Scoliacma pasteophara Turner, 1940
Scoliacma xuthopis Hampson, 1914
Stenarcha stenopa (Meyrick, 1886)
Stenoscaptia venusta (T.P. Lucas, 1890)
Symmetrodes platymelas Turner, 1940
Symmetrodes sciocosma Meyrick, 1888
Teratopora acosma (Turner, 1899)
Termessa catocalina (Walker, 1865)
Termessa congrua (Walker, 1865)
Termessa conographa (Meyrick, 1886)
Termessa diplographa Turner, 1899
Termessa discrepans (Walker, 1865)
Termessa gratiosa (Walker, 1865)
Termessa laeta (Walker, 1856)
Termessa nivosa (Walker, 1865)
Termessa orthocrossa Turner, 1922
Termessa shepherdi Newman, 1856
Termessa xanthomelas (Lower, 1892)
Termessa zonophanes (Meyrick, 1888)
Teulisna bipunctata (Walker, 1866)
Teulisna chiloides Walker, 1862
Thallarcha albicollis (R. Felder & Rogenhofer, 1875)
Thallarcha catasticta Lower, 1915
Thallarcha chrysochares Meyrick, 1886
Thallarcha chrysochoa (Meyrick, 1886)
Thallarcha cosmodes Turner, 1940
Thallarcha epicela Turner, 1922
Thallarcha epigypsa (Lower, 1902)
Thallarcha epileuca Turner, 1922
Thallarcha epiostola Turner, 1926
Thallarcha eremicola Pescott, 1951
Thallarcha erotis Turner, 1914
Thallarcha fusa Hampson, 1900
Thallarcha homoschema Turner, 1940
Thallarcha isophragma (Meyrick, 1886)
Thallarcha jocularis (Rosenstock, 1885)
Thallarcha lechrioleuca Turner, 1940
Thallarcha leptographa Turner, 1899
Thallarcha levis Turner, 1943
Thallarcha lochaga (Meyrick, 1886)
Thallarcha macilenta (T.P. Lucas, 1894)
Thallarcha mochlina (Turner, 1899)
Thallarcha oblita (R. Felder & Rogenhofer, 1875)
Thallarcha partita (Walker, 1869)
Thallarcha pellax Turner, 1940
Thallarcha phalarota Meyrick, 1886
Thallarcha polystigma Turner, 1943
Thallarcha rhaptophora Lower, 1915
Thallarcha sparsana (Walker, 1863)
Thallarcha staurocola (Meyrick, 1886)
Thallarcha stramenticolor Turner, 1940
Thallarcha trissomochla Turner, 1940
Thallarcha zophophanes Turner, 1940
Thermeola tasmanica Hampson, 1900
Threnosia agraphes Turner, 1940
Threnosia heminephes (Meyrick, 1886)
Threnosia hypopolia Turner, 1940
Threnosia myochroa Turner, 1940
Thumatha fuscescens Walker, 1866
Tigrioides alterna (Walker, 1854)
Tigrioides nitens (Walker, 1865)
Trischalis aureoplagiata (Rothschild, 1913)
Trissobrocha eugraphica Turner, 1914
Tylanthes ptochias Meyrick, 1889

External links 
Arctiidae at Australian Faunal Directory

Australia